Eilean Mhuire (meaning "Virgin Mary's island") is the most easterly of the Shiant Islands in the Outer Hebrides.

Once populated, Eilean Mhuire is now used only for grazing sheep. There was an old local tradition that said there used to be a chapel on the island. There are various ruins on the island, and the Ordnance Survey mark some remains as that of a “St. Mary's Chapel" on the western side of the island. But this is based only on information provided in 1851 that the island had been the refuge of a priest "in the time of Knox".  Nicolson (2002) has concluded that this tradition is mistaken, but has speculated that Eilean Mhuire may instead have been a hermitage in pre-Norse times. (And there was in fact a chapel on nearby Eilean an Taighe, possibly devoted to the Virgin Mary.)

In 1549, Donald Monro, then Dean of the Isles, wrote that Eilean Mhuire was:
callit Senchastle by the Eriche, that is the alde castle ile in the Englishe, an strenthe, full of corne and grassinge, full of wyld fowls nests, and verey guid for fishing. It perteins to M’Cloyd of the Lewis.

Today, Seann Chaisteal (“old castle”) is the name of the flat-topped tidal islet at the south-eastern extremity of Eilean Mhuire. This islet is a "large tidal rock on which there never was a building of any kind", so the name may simply have been inspired by the rock's shape and appearance.

Notes and references

Notes

Footnotes

General references
 
 Martin, Martin (1703) A Description of The Western Islands of Scotland (Circa 1695) . Appin Regiment/Appin Historical Society. Retrieved 3 March 2007
 
 Nicolson, Adam (2002) Sea Room. London. HarperCollins. 

Shiant Islands